Niki Panetta; born 21 April 1986 in Ilion, Athens is a Greek triple jumper.

She finished sixth at the 2012 European Championships. Her personal best is 14.55 metres achieved in Athens on July 7, 2011. At the indoor truck she has jumped 14.47 metres on February 22, 2012 in Piraeus.

Competition record

References

1986 births
Living people
Greek female triple jumpers
Athletes from Athens
Athletes (track and field) at the 2012 Summer Olympics
Olympic athletes of Greece
Athletes (track and field) at the 2013 Mediterranean Games
Mediterranean Games competitors for Greece